Madhusudan Katti is an Indian American environmental scientist who is an Associate Professor of Ecology at the North Carolina State University. His research studies the evolutionary ecology of vertebrate response to human modifications of habitats.

Early life and education 
Katti was born in India. He attended The Institute of Science, Mumbai, where he graduated with a bachelor's degree in zoology in 1987. During his undergraduate degree, he became interested in wildlife and birdsong. He joined the Wildlife Institute of India as a graduate student, where he studied wildlife sciences. He moved to the United States for graduate studies and majored in biology. His doctoral research considered the ecology and evolution of leaf warblers in the Great Himalayas. After earning his doctorate, he was made a reconciliation ecologist.

Research and career 
In 2016, Katti joined North Carolina State University as the Chancellor’s Faculty Excellence Program hire in Leadership in Public Science. His research considers animals and plants in urban environments, with a focus on improving biodiversity amongst human inhabited communities. He has also studied how humans impact animal behavior, for example, how urban noise impacts birdsong. Katti leads the Urban Long-Term Research Area – Fresno And Clovis Ecosocial Study (ULTRA-FACES) project, which evaluates how human water use, water policy and urban biodiversity impact one another in the Central Valley in California.

Katti has explored ways to decolonize ecological research. He proposed that efforts to decolonize ecology would involve individual reflection, considering the varied ways of knowing and communicating science, understanding histories, decolonizing access to and expertise in science and practising ecology in ethical inclusive teams.

In 2022, Katti was announced as the executive editor of the Bulletin of the Ecological Society of America.

Selected publications 
 
 ]

References 

Living people
North Carolina State University faculty
Year of birth missing (living people)
Academic journal editors
Environmental scientists
University of California, San Diego alumni
Indian emigrants to the United States
21st-century American scientists
20th-century American scientists